The Canadian cricket team played the Afghan cricket team in 2010 in Sharjah in the United Arab Emirates. Owing to the security situation in Afghanistan, they are unable to play home games in their own country, and so play home series in various locations in the Middle East and Indian subcontinent. The teams played two One Day Internationals and an Intercontinental Cup match.

Squads

Intercontinental Cup Match

ODI series

1st ODI

2nd ODI

2010 in cricket
2010 in Canadian cricket
2010 in Afghan cricket
2010 in Emirati cricket
International cricket competitions in 2009–10
2010
Afghan cricket tours of the United Arab Emirates
Canadian cricket tours of the United Arab Emirates